The 2018–19 Loyola Greyhounds women's basketball team represents Loyola University Maryland during the 2018–19 NCAA Division I women's basketball season. The Greyhounds, led by thirteenth year head coach Joe Logan, play their home games at Reitz Arena and were members of the Patriot League. They finished the season 7–24, 5–13 in Patriot League play to finish in a tie for eighth place. They advanced to the quarterfinals of the Patriot League women's tournament where they lost to Bucknell.

Roster

Schedule

|-
!colspan=9 style=| Non-conference regular season

|-
!colspan=9 style=| Patriot League regular season

|-
!colspan=9 style=| Patriot League Women's Tournament

See also
 2018–19 Loyola Greyhounds men's basketball team

References

Loyola
Loyola Greyhounds women's basketball seasons